Sentinel Dome is a granite dome in Yosemite National Park, United States.

Sentinel Dome is known for a Jeffrey Pine that grew from its peak (see photograph). The pine was photographed as early as 1867 by Carleton Watkins, and was the subject of a well-known photograph by Ansel Adams. The tree died during the drought of 1976, but remained standing until August 2003.

History

The original Native American name of Sentinel Dome, in the Southern Sierra Miwok language, was "Sakkaduch". The Bunnell survey named it "South Dome", but the Whitney survey renamed it Sentinel Dome (from its likeness to a watch-tower). The view from the top offers a 360 degree view of Yosemite Valley and surroundings. One can see Half Dome, El Capitan, Yosemite Falls, North Dome, Basket Dome, and much more. Sentinel Dome provides a 360 degree view of the night sky and it and nearby Glacier Point are popular places for stargazing.

Hiking trail
The trail to the base of Sentinel Dome is a relatively easy  hike. Once at the base, hikers traverse the less imposing northeast granite slope to the summit. In winter, Sentinel Dome can be reached from Badger Pass by a 10-miles ski tour.

References

External links
 
 

Mountains of Mariposa County, California
Granite domes of Yosemite National Park
Tourist attractions in Mariposa County, California
Hills of California